Grant Newton Cederwall (born 4 July 1959) is a New Zealand former cricketer and rugby union player.

Cederwall was born at Dunedin in July 1959. He made his debut in first-class cricket for Wellington against Central Districts at Napier in the 1978–79 Shell Trophy. He played first-class cricket for Wellington until November 1990, making a total of 35 appearances. Playing as an all-rounder, he scored 794 runs in his 35 first-class matches, at an average of 19.36 and a highest score of 68. With his right-arm medium pace bowling, he took 73 wickets at a bowling average of 34.08. He took a five wicket haul once, with figures of 7 for 97 against Northern Districts in the 1988–89 Shell Trophy. Cederwall also played List A one-day cricket for Wellington, debuting in that format against Central Districts at Wanganui in the 1982–83 Shell Cup. He played List A cricket for Wellington until January 1989, making a total of 28 appearances. He was less effective as a batsman in one-day cricket, scoring 199 runs at an average of 10.47, with a high score of 37. With the ball, he took 28 wickets an average of 24.46 and best figures of 5 for 17. These figures, one of two five wicket hauls he took in one-day cricket, came against Canterbury in the 1984–85 Shell Cup. In addition to playing first-class and List A cricket in New Zealand, Cederwall also played minor counties cricket in England for Bedfordshire in 1983, making five appearances in the Minor Counties Championship and a single appearance in the MCCA Knockout Trophy.

Outside of playing cricket, Cederwall also played rugby union, representing Wellington in a single match in 1979. Cederwall currently works as a real estate agent. In 1999, he was a founding member of the Wellington-based Tommy's Real Estate Ltd. His brother, Brian Cederwall, played rugby union over a hundred times for Wellington.

References

External links

1959 births
Living people
Cricketers from Dunedin
Wellington cricketers
Bedfordshire cricketers
Rugby union players from Dunedin
Wellington rugby union players
New Zealand real estate agents
Real estate company founders